Herðubreið (broad-shouldered) is a tuya in northern part of Vatnajökull National Park, Iceland. It is situated in the Highlands of Iceland at the east side of the Ódáðahraun  desert and close to Askja volcano. The desert is a large lava field originating from eruptions of Trölladyngja and other shield volcanoes in the area. Herðubreið was formed beneath the icesheet that covered Iceland during the last glacial period.

Overview
Due to the mountain's steep and unstable sides, the first ascent was in 1908 despite centuries of knowledge of its existence.

The Mountain is often referred to as "The Queen of Icelandic Mountains" by Icelanders due to its beautiful shape.

Near the mountain lies an oasis called Herðubreiðarlindir  with a campground and hiking trails. In former times, outcasts who had been excluded from Icelandic society because of crimes they had committed lived at the oasis. One such outlaw was Fjalla-Eyvindur, who lived there during the winter of 1774–1775.

In 2019 Herðubreið became a part of Vatnajökull National Park.

See also
 Geography of Iceland
 Volcanism of Iceland

References

External links

 Official Website of Vatnajökull National Park
 
Images
 Herðubreiðarlindir – picture gallery from islandsmyndir.is
 http://isafold.de/panorama/panoram.htm (via "Askja")

Mountains of Iceland
Tuyas of Iceland
Pleistocene volcanoes
North Volcanic Zone of Iceland
One-thousanders of Iceland